Sprague is a community within the Rural Municipality of Piney in the Canadian province of Manitoba. It is named after D.E. Sprague, a prominent Winnipeg lumber merchant.  The community is located in the extreme southeast corner of the province near the Canada–United States border (Warroad–Sprague Border Crossing), at the junction of Manitoba Highway 12 and Provincial Road 308.

The nearest major centres include Warroad and Thief River Falls, Minnesota; Fort Frances, Ontario; and Steinbach, Manitoba.

Climate
Sprague has a humid continental climate (Köppen Dfb) with strong seasonal swings. Although winters are very cold, snowfall is normally not excessive compared to areas further east. Summer afternoons are warm and variable with cool nights.

See also
 Northwest Angle
 Warroad–Sprague Border Crossing

References

External links
 RM of Piney Communities - Sprague, Manitoba

Unincorporated communities in Eastman Region, Manitoba